Sood-Oberleimbach is a railway station in the Sihl Valley, and the municipality of Adliswil, in the Swiss Canton of Zürich. The station is on the Sihltal line, which is operated by the Sihltal Zürich Uetliberg Bahn (SZU).

The station is served by the following passenger trains:

References 

Railway stations in the canton of Zürich